The following lists events that happened during 1960 in the Grand Duchy of Luxembourg.

Incumbents

Events

 29 March – Representing Luxembourg, Camillo Felgen finishes thirteenth (and last) in the Eurovision Song Contest 1960 with the song So laang we's du do bast.
 4 July – The completed grounds of the Luxembourg American Cemetery and Memorial are dedicated.
 17 September – King Bhumibol of Thailand makes a state visit to Luxembourg, lasting until 19 September.

Births
 30 January – Claude Wiseler, politician
 20 April – Danièle Kaber, athlete
 1 August – Robby Langers, footballer
 20 September – Fonsy Grethen, billiards player
 26 November – Claude Turmes, politician
 4 December – Eugène Berger, politician and climber
 21 December – Bady Minck, artist & filmmaker

Deaths

Footnotes

References
 

 
Years of the 20th century in Luxembourg
1960s in Luxembourg
Luxembourg
Luxembourg